Hijuk is a minor Bantu language of Cameroon. Guthrie had left it unclassified within the Bafia languages (A.50), but according to Ethnologue, it has only 31% lexical similarity with Bafia, and 87% with Basaa.

References

Bafia languages
Basaa languages
Languages of Cameroon